Mandy Carter may refer to:

 Mandy Carter (Ackley Bridge), fictional character from the Channel 4 school drama
 Mandy Carter (activist) (born 1948), American LGBT rights activist
 Mandy Carter (Mandy), main character in the BBC TV series

See also
 Amanda Carter (born 1964), Australian wheelchair basketball player